is a Quasi-National Park in northern Kyōto Prefecture, Japan.

Sites of interest
 , Kehara terraces, Tango Matsushima

Related municipalities
 Fukuchiyama, Ine, Kyōtango, Maizuru, Miyazu, Yosano

See also

 National Parks of Japan
 Wakasa Wan Quasi-National Park

References

External links
  Pamphlet
 Map

National parks of Japan
Parks and gardens in Kyoto Prefecture
Protected areas established in 2007
2007 establishments in Japan